As an indigenous West Asian people, Jews have been present in western Asia since the beginning of their history. Some examples of ancient Jewish communities in the Mediterranean and Caucasus are: Iran (Persian Jews) and Iraq (Iraqi Jews); the Georgian Jews and Mountain Jews of the Caucasus.

Through the centuries, they also established Jewish communities in eastern parts of Asia. There are Bukharan Jews of Central Asia. Some Jews migrated to India, establishing the Bene Israel, the Baghdadi Jews and the Cochin Jews of India (Jews in India); and the former Jewish community in Kaifeng, China.

Here is a partial list of some prominent Asian Jews, arranged by country. Note that those regions of Asia where Arabic or Russian or Turkish predominate are excluded from this list (except for the Baghdadi Jews from India and Southeast Asia); see Middle Eastern Jews, Ashkenazi Jews and Sephardi Jews for information on these populations.

Armenia 
 Levon Aronian, Armenian chess player (part Jewish)

Azerbaijan

 Misha Black, designer; brother of Max Black
 Bella Davidovich, pianist
 Gavril Abramovich Ilizarov, Soviet physician, known for inventing the Ilizarov apparatus
 Lev Landau, physicist, Nobel Prize (1962).  Russian-speaking Ashkenazi.
 Lev Nussimbaum, writer (a.k.a. Kurban Said)
 Vladimir Rokhlin, mathematician. Russian-speaking Ashkenazi.

Afghanistan
A small community of Jews lived mainly in Herat, Afghanistan and Kabul, but they emigrated to Israel, Europe and the United States. In September 2021, the last remaining Jew in Afghanistan, Zablon Simintov,  fled Afghanistan 's capital Kabul in response to the Taliban takeover several weeks prior.

China

 Morris Cohen, bodyguard of Sun Yat-Sen
 Misha Dichter, pianist (China-born)
 Israel Epstein, journalist, author
 Edmond Fischer, biochemist, Nobel Prize (1992) 
 Jakob Rosenfeld, doctor and general in the People's Liberation Army
 Sidney Shapiro, member of the People's Political Consultative Council
 Zhao Yingcheng, (Hebrew: Moshe ben Abram), Ming dynasty mandarin

Georgia 
 David Baazov, Zionist activist and rabbi
 Ioseb Bardanashvili, composer
 Roman Dzindzichashvili, American chess player 
 Yasha Manasherov, Israeli Greco-Roman wrestler
 Mikhael Mirilashvili, businessman and philanthropist
 Tamir Sapir, businessman and investor
 Gocha Tsitsiashvili, Israeli Greco-Roman wrestler

Hong Kong

 Ellis, Elly, Lawrence, and Michael Kadoorie, businesspeople
 Matthew Nathan, Hong Kong governor (1904)
 Victor Sassoon, businessman and hotelier

India

 Sarah Avraham, Indian-born Israeli, 2014 women's world Thai kickboxing champion
 Joseph Rabban, given copper plates of special grants from the Chera ruler Bhaskara Ravivarman II from Kerala in South India
 David Abraham Cheulkar, actor
 Nissim Ezekiel, poet
 J F R Jacob, former Governor of Punjab and Goa; the Chief of Staff of the Indian Army's Eastern Command
 Hakham Ezra Reuben David Barook, a High Priest in Jerusalem in 1856; he traveled to India and settled in Calcutta.  He is buried in the Jewish Cemetery at Narkeldanga
 Gerry Judah, artist and designer 
 Anish Kapoor, sculptor (Baghdadi Jewish mother, Indian father)
John Prabhudoss , currently the Chairman of the Federation of Indian American Christian Organizations (FIACONA); mother is of mixed Cochin Jewish descent.
 Samson Kehimkar, musician
 Ezekiel Isaac Malekar, Bene Israel Rabbi
 Pearl Padamsee, theatre personality (part Jewish)
 David and Simon Reuben, businessmen
 Nadira, actress of the 1950s and 1960s.
 David Sassoon, businessman
 Albert Abdullah David Sassoon (1818 – 24 October 1896), British-Indian merchant
 Sassoon David Sassoon (August 1832 – 23 June 1867), Indian-born British businessman and philanthropist
 Solomon Sopher, Jewish community leader
 Eli Ben-Menachem, Indian-born Israeli politician
 Ellis Kadoorie and Elly Kadoorie, philanthropists
 Horace Kadoorie, philanthropist
 Ruby Myers, Bollywood actress of the 1920s, otherwise known as Sulochana
 Lalchanhima Sailo, rabbi
 Abraham Barak Salem, Cochin Jew Indian nationalist leader
 Bensiyon Songavkar, professional cricketer

Iran/Persia

 Sa'ad al-Dawla, (c. 1240 – March 5, 1291), Physician and statesman
 David Alliance, British businessman
 Mashallah ibn Athari, eighth-century astrologer, astronomer, and mathematician
 Moses ben Hanoch, rabbi
 Yossi Banai, performer
 Soleyman Binafard, wrestler
 Sahl ibn Bishr, nine-century astrologer, astronomer, and mathematician
 Jimmy Delshad, Californian politician
 Roya Hakakian, writer
 Moshe Katsav, Israeli president
 Rita Kleinstein, Israeli singer/actress, known popularly as "Rita"
 Janet Kohan-Sedq, track and field athlete
 Masarjawaih, physician and translator
 Mashallah ibn Athari, astrologer and astronomer
 Shaul Mofaz, Israeli Minister of Transportation
 Bahar Soomekh, American actress   
 Soleiman Haim, among first compilers of Persian dictionary

Israel

Japan

 Alfred Birnbaum
 Dan Calichman
 Julie Dreyfus
 Rachel Elior
 Ofer Feldman, University professor
 Péter Frankl, Hungarian mathematician
 Shaul Eisenberg, businessman 
 Martin "Marty" Adam Friedman, rock guitarist
 Ayako Fujitani, writer and actress, convert
 Szymon Goldberg
 David G. Goodman, Japanologist
 Karl Taro Greenfeld, journalist and author
 Manfred Gurlitt
 Jack Halpern, Israeli linguist, Kanji-scholar
 Shifra Horn
 Hoshitango Imachi, né Imachi Marcelo Salomon
 Chaim Janowski
 Max Janowski
 Charles Louis Kades
 Rena "Rusty" Kanokogi, née Glickman
 Abraham Kaufman
 Michael Kogan, founder of Taito
 Fumiko Kometani, author and artist, convert
 Setsuzo (Avraham) Kotsuji, Hebrew professor, convert
 Leonid Kreutzer, pianist
 Yaacov Liberman
 Henryk Lipszyc
 Leza Lowitz, American Japanologist
 Alan Merrill
 Sulamith Messerer
 Emmanuel Metter
 Albert Mosse
 John Nathan
 Emil Orlík
 Klaus Pringsheim Sr.
 Roger Pulvers
 Ludwig Riess
 Joseph Rosenstock, conductor of the NHK Symphony Orchestra
 Jay Rubin
 Arie Selinger
 Ben-Ami Shillony, Israeli Japanologist
 Kurt Singer
 Beate Sirota Gordon, former Performing Arts Director of Japan Society and Asia Society
 Leo Sirota
 Zerach Warhaftig

 Refugees, short expatriates
 Moshe Atzmon
 George W. F. Hallgarten
 Albert Kahn (banker)
 Mirra Alfassa
 Emil Lederer
 Karl Löwith
 Norman Mailer
 Leo Melamed
 Franz Oppenheimer
 Samuel Isaac Joseph Schereschewsky (Christian)
 Hayyim Selig Slonimski

 Other related people to Judaism and Jews in Japan
 Hana Brady, and George Brady
 Jeremy Glick
 Lili Kraus
 Samuel Ullman

Ambassadors 
 Eli Cohen

Kyrgyzstan

 Alexander Mashkevich, businessman (Kyrgyz-born)

Singapore

 David Marshall, first Chief Minister of Singapore, founder and first chairman of the main opposition party the Workers' Party of Singapore

Sri Lanka
 Sidney Abrahams, Chief Justice
 Hedi Keuneman, political activist
 Anne Ranasinghe, poet  
 Leonard Woolf, British administrative officer and author, later married author Virginia

Tajikistan

Rena Galibova, actress, "People's Artist of Tajikistan"
Meirkhaim Gavrielov, journalist and political opposition leader
Malika Kalantarova, dancer, "People's Artist of Soviet Union"
Fatima Kuinova, singer, "Merited Artist of the Soviet Union"
Shoista Mullodzhanova, shashmakon singer, "People's Artist of Tajikistan" (viewed as the Queen of Tajik music)
Moses Znaimer, TV producer

Uzbekistan

Ari Babakhanov, musician
Yefim Bronfman, pianist
Lev Leviev, diamond tycoon
Ilyas Malayev, musician and poet
Shlomo Moussaieff (businessman), Israeli businessman 
Shlomo Moussaieff (rabbi), co-founder of the Bukharian Quarter in Jerusalem 
Gavriel Mullokandov, shashmakom artist, "People's Artist of Uzbekistan"
Suleiman Yudakov, composer and musician, "People's Artist of the Soviet Union"

See also
List of Jews
Jewish Autonomous Oblast
List of Jews from the Arab World

References

Bibliography

Asian Jews
 
Jews,Asian